Prosopis alba is a South American tree species that grows in central Argentina, the Gran Chaco ecoregion, and part of the Argentine Mesopotamia, as well as Bolivia, Paraguay, and Peru. It is known as algarrobo blanco ('white carob tree') in Spanish. Spanish settlers gave it that name because of its similarity to the European carob tree (Ceratonia siliqua). Other common names come from Guaraní, including ibopé and igopé.

The trunk is short and the treetop is globular, sometimes reaching  in diameter. The bark is thin, brown-grayish in colour, with streaks, and it has tanning properties.

The tree is employed for ornamental and utilitary roadside planting and windbreaks. Its timber, which is rather dense (relative density = 0.76) and difficult to work, is used for doors and floors, for furniture, for paving blocks, shoe lasts and wine casks (where it replaces the European oak). The wood responds well to drying and is therefore valuable for work that requires stable dimensions regardless of humidity. It is also durable for outdoor use.

The flowers are small, greenish-white or yellowish, and bisexual.  Pollination, mediated by wind and insects, is allogamous (crossed), since the female reproductive organs are turned active before the male ones.

They contain a sweet floury paste (patay), very high in energy, that can be used for fodder or turned into flour for human consumption. In the 1940s a mildly intoxicating beverage called aloja was made from it through fermentation; in turn it was sometimes distilled to produce ethanol. Between half and three quarters of the fruit's weight is sugar.

The tree can reportedly tolerate drought, salt and sand; in fact, it is extremely efficient with regard to water consumption, it produces the most fruits in years of drought and has been successfully introduced in arid terrains. However, it cannot stand even mild frost.

Prosopis alba and other algarrobo species in genus Prosopis, such as algarrobo negro (P. nigra), are often confused or not correctly distinguished in botanical literature; in part this is due to the ease of hybridization of the genus.

References

Further reading

Celulosa Argentina, Ed. Libro del Árbol: Especies Forestales Indígenes de la Argentina de Aplicación Industrial. Buenos Aires. 1975.

alba
Plants described in 1874
Trees of Argentina
Edible legumes
Drought-tolerant trees
Near threatened plants